Hyles calida, the Hawaiian sphinx, is a moth of the family Sphingidae. The species was first described by Arthur Gardiner Butler in 1881. It is endemic to Kauai, Oahu, Molokai and Hawaii.

The larvae feed on Acacia koa, Bobea elatior, Coprosma, Gardenia, Metrosideros, Pelea, Scaevola chamissoniana, Scaevola gaudichaudiana and Straussia. Adults feed on flowers of Lantana, Metrosideros and others.

Description 
Larvae are about 60 mm long.

Subspecies
Hyles calida calida (Kauai, Oahu and Molokai)
Hyles calida calida hawaiiensis Rothschild and Jordan, 1915 (Hawaii)

References

Hyles (moth)
Endemic moths of Hawaii
Moths described in 1881